Yangmei is a railway station on the Taiwan Railways Administration West Coast line located in Yangmei District, Taoyuan City, Taiwan.

History 
The original station was first opened in 1893 as Tochongxi (頭重溪) station. It was moved to a new location on 20 July 1899 and renamed Yangmeili (楊梅壢停車場) and eventually to its current name in 1920. A new concrete station building was built in 1929. Taiwan Easy Go contactless smart card faregates were installed at this station on 26 March 2010. New elevated platforms as well as the third-generation station building were opened in 2010 and 2011 respectively.

Structure 
There are two island platforms. Another entrance and an overpass connecting the two entrances of the station are currently being built.

Service 
As a minor station, Yangmei Station is primarily serviced by Local Trains. The Tzu-Chiang Limited Express does not stop at this station.

Around the station 
 Arwin Charisma Museum Tourist Factory
 Taitung Story Museum

See also
 List of railway stations in Taiwan

References

External links 

TRA Yangmei Station 

1893 establishments in Taiwan
Railway stations in Taoyuan City
Railway stations opened in 1893
Railway stations served by Taiwan Railways Administration